The Chevron B9 is an open-wheel formula racing car, designed, developed and built by Chevron Cars, specifically designed to compete in Formula Three racing, in 1968. It was very successful, winning the British Formula Three Championship in its debut year, with Tim Schenken.

References

Formula Three cars
1960s cars
Chevron racing cars